Andrea McEwan (born 9 October 1978) is an Australian actress, singer, musician and songwriter.

Career
After attending MacRobertson Girls' High School in Melbourne, McEwan started acting, appearing in several television series including Ocean Girl and Funky Squad. In 1991 she was nominated for a Gladys Moncrieff Award for Outstanding New Talent by the Music Theatre Guild of Victoria after her performance in Annie. She has also appeared several times in the soap opera Neighbours. Her first role as Sonia came in 1989, then in 1991 she played Sarah Livingston, followed by Nicole Cahill in 1995. She played Penny Watts in 2002.

In 2000, McEwan studied at National Institute of Dramatic Arts. She moved to the United Kingdom in the 2000s and in 2005 she appeared in Coronation Street where she played Lisa Ditchfield.

After moving to the UK, McEwan started singing and song writing professionally and in 2006 was signed to Mike Batt's Dramatico record label. In 2007, she collaborated with Katie Melua, writing lyrics for "What I Miss About You" and Dirty Dice which appeared on Melua's third album, Pictures.

McEwan toured the UK in late 2008 supporting Katie Melua. In 2008 she released a three track E.P., Candle in a Chatroom featuring the songs "Candle in a Chatroom", "Black Socks in the Wash" and "Fast Train". She released the second single ("Alibi") at the beginning of April.

Her debut album Rental Property released at end of May 2009 by Dramatico Entertainment Ltd.

Filmography
 1989–2002: Neighbours
 1994: Ocean Girl
 1994–2002: Blue Heelers
 1995: Funky Squad
 2001: All Saints
 2001: BeastMaster
 2001–2002: McLeod's Daughters
 2003: CrashBurn
 2004: The Secret Life of Us
 2005: Coronation Street

References

External links
Official website
Personal Blog of Andrea McEwan about living in Berlin

1978 births
Living people
Australian television actresses
Australian jazz singers
Australian singer-songwriters
National Institute of Dramatic Art alumni
Jazz-pop singers
Australian emigrants to the United Kingdom
Australian folk-pop singers
Actresses from Melbourne
21st-century Australian actresses
Australian emigrants to Germany
21st-century Australian singers
21st-century Australian women singers
Australian women singer-songwriters